Dakoro is a town and commune located in the Maradi Region of Niger.

Communes of Maradi Region